William "Ted" Francis Buffalo (November 5, 1901 – August 19, 1969) was a professional football player who played in the National Football League during the 1923 season.

Biography
Buffalo was born in Red Cliff, Wisconsin, and attended Haskell Indian Nations University. In 1923, he joined the NFL's Oorang Indians, a team based in LaRue, Ohio which was composed of only Native Americans. The team was coached by Jim Thorpe. Buffalo played one season in the NFL. He was a Chippewa and 23 years old when he joined the team.

He died on August 19, 1969, in Washburn, Wisconsin.

References

Further reading

External links 
Uniform Numbers of the NFL

1900s births
Native American players of American football
Players of American football from Wisconsin
People from Bayfield County, Wisconsin
Oorang Indians players
1969 deaths
Haskell Indian Nations University alumni